Moutya or Moutia, is a traditional African dance similar to the Sega, but with often more pronounced suggestive movements. Female and male dancers move in rhythm to the beat of the often single drum made of dried goatskin and lightly heated up by a bonfire prior to the start of the Dance (and regular during the evening). Dancing starts off slowly in time to the beat of the drums, but speeds up and becomes more erotic as the beating becomes faster and faster and faster.

The beat and dance are always accompanied by singing which usually recounts the hardships and joys of everyday life. Until the late 1970s, the Moutya was considered more of a risqué dance and generally shunned.

Seychellois culture